Crow's Eye View (Hangul: 오감도, Hanja: 烏瞰圖) is 15 series of Korean poem written by Yi Sang. It was published on 《Chosunjoongangilbo (Hanja: 朝鮮中央日報)》 from July 24, 1934 to August 8. The poem was originally planned as 30 series, but Yi Sang could only publish 15 because many readers sent letters that the poetry is too hard to understand. It is impossible to grasp the specific meaning of poetry, and only anxiety, fear, and confusion are vaguely conveyed to readers in the overall feeling of poetry.

Origin of title 
A bird's eye view is an elevated view of an object from above, with a perspective as though the observer were a bird. The poet replaced 鳥 (which means bird) to 烏 (which means crow) as the title. The general view of the meaning of the title is that these titles are intentional expressions to reveal anxiety. The word crow, which traditionally means misfortune, also makes the atmosphere of this poem reluctant. There is also an anecdote about this title. Since the word '烏瞰圖' (Crow's Eye View) doesn't exist in Korean dictionary, printing press kept asking that if the title was a typo of '鳥瞰圖' (bird's eye view).

Poem No.1

English Version 
Click Here for English Version.

Analysis 
It is noticeable that the poem is not spaced at all. Since Korean is a spoken language, spacing is the most basic rule of speech. When not spaced, it is not only confusing to read but also difficult to grasp the meaning. Violating the basic code of such grammar implies the poet's rebellion and disobedience to the symbolic power of the world, and the desire for aesthetic freedom.

Usually, in the 1930s of Korea (which was Japanese occupation period), people would have had to live in despair wherever they went. Also, Yi Sang was suffering from lung disease, so he always had threats of death. The thirteen people who lost their sense of life and direction are self-portraits of his nation and their own image. This poem expresses fear, frustration, and faint hope of the colonial poet who had to live in a heartbreaking period of anxiety and fear in the paradoxical situation of 'dead end' and 'open end'.

There are various analysis of the '13' children. One of the most common analysis of the number is that it represents the 13 people at the Last Supper. The part where it says '13Childrenwerejustgatheredtogetherlikethataseitherfrighteningorfrightenedchildren (TheabsenceofanyotherConditionwerehighlypreferable)' shows the anxiety of Judas, who is destined to betray Jesus and the anxiety of other apostles who doesn't know who the betrayer is.

Poem No.4

Analysis 
The common analysis of this poem is that the numbers symbolize geometric sequence. The sequence always converges to zero, which symbolizes death. Also, it can be related with his tuberculosis that he was suffering from. The problem relating to this poem was presented on College Scholastic Ability Test (South Korea) 2003.

See also 
Yi Sang

The Wings (Yi Sang)

References 

Korean poetry